Walter Warren Magee (May 23, 1861 – May 25, 1927) was an American lawyer and politician from New York.  He was most notable for his service as a member of the United States House of Representatives; elected as a Republican in 1914, he served from 1915 until his death.

Biography

Magee was born in Groveland, New York on May 23, 1861, a son of farmers Marietta (Patchin) Magee and John Magee, who served as a colonel in the state militia.  He attended the local schools and the Wadsworth Normal and Training School (now the State University of New York at Geneseo).  Magee graduated from Harvard University in 1889, and delivered the class oration at his graduation ceremony.  He then studied law at the Syracuse firm of Baldwin & Kennedy, and was admitted to the bar in 1891.  He practiced law in Syracuse until 1904, and gained a reputation as a skilled trial attorney.  Magee was also a talented athlete, and competed in tennis tournaments and other events.

A Republican, Magee served on the Onondaga County Board of Supervisors from 1892 to 1893.  From 1904 to 1914, Magee served as Syracuse's corporation counsel.

In 1914, Magee won election to the House of Representatives.  He was reelected six times, and served until his death.  During his House career, Magee was appointed to the Appropriations Committee, and he rose through seniority to become chairman of its subcommittee on Agriculture.

Death and burial
Magee died in Syracuse on May 25, 1927.  He was buried at Oakwood Cemetery in Syracuse.

Family
In 1895, Magee married Sarah Genevieve Wood (1873-1937), who was usually called Genevieve.  They had no children.  Genevieve Wood was the daughter of US Army Brigadier General Palmer G. Wood (1843-1915).

See also
 List of United States Congress members who died in office (1900–49)

References

Sources

Books

Newspapers

External links

1861 births
1927 deaths
Phillips Exeter Academy alumni
Harvard University alumni
Politicians from Syracuse, New York
Republican Party members of the United States House of Representatives from New York (state)
People from Groveland, New York
Burials at Oakwood Cemetery (Syracuse, New York)
Lawyers from Syracuse, New York
19th-century American lawyers